CST6 can refer to:
 Clova/Lac Duchamp Water Aerodrome
 CST6 (gene)